"Me Julie" is a single released by Ali G and Jamaican musician Shaggy from the soundtrack to the 2002 film Ali G Indahouse. The single was written in reference to the main character Ali G's love interest in the film, Julie, played by Kellie Bright. "Me Julie" peaked at number two on the UK Singles Chart behind "Unchained Melody" by Gareth Gates and sold 300,000 copies in the United Kingdom, as stated by the Official Charts Company.

Track listing
 "Me Julie"
 "Me Julie" (Big League Remix)
 "Me Julie" (Instrumental)

Charts

Weekly charts

Year-end charts

Certifications

Release history

References

2002 songs
2002 singles
Island Records singles
Shaggy (musician) songs